Mimusops zeyheri  is a medium-sized (up to 15m) evergreen tree belonging to the family Sapotaceae and widely distributed in rocky places from the east coast of southern Africa, inland and northwards to tropical Africa. It is commonly known as milkwood or Transvaal red milkwood. It is closely related to Mimusops obovata and M. caffra, both of which are South African trees.

Description
Its leaves are leathery and entire. Petioles and young leaves are covered in short rusty red hairs. Small amounts of latex can be seen on bruised leaves or petioles. The ripe yellow fruits have a glossy, brittle skin and are sweet and edible, floury in texture and slightly astringent. The wood is reddish-brown in colour, hard and tough, and was traditionally used in the making of wagons. Clusters of fragrant white flowers appear from October to January.

Habit
Given sufficient space, this species can grow into a very large, densely shady tree. Some enormous specimens are to be seen amongst the Zimbabwe Ruins. This species is often found in association with Englerophytum magalismontanum.

Gallery

See also

List of Southern African indigenous trees

References

zeyheri
Flora of South Tropical Africa
Flora of Tanzania
Trees of Angola
Trees of Botswana
Trees of South Africa
Flora of Swaziland
Taxa named by Otto Wilhelm Sonder